Dukatino is a village in the municipality of Vasilevo, North Macedonia.

Demographics
According to the 2002 census, the village had a total of 450 inhabitants. Ethnic groups in the village include:

Macedonians 447
Others 3

References

Villages in Vasilevo Municipality